Xenostega is a genus of moths in the family Geometridae described by Warren in 1899.

Species
Xenostega fallax Warren, 1899
Xenostega irrorata Prout, 1915
Xenostega diagramma (Hampson, 1910)
Xenostega tincta Warren, 1899
Xenostega tyana C. Swinhoe, 1904

References

Abraxini
Monotypic moth genera